2016 Emperor's Cup Final was the 96th final of the Emperor's Cup competition. The final was played at Suita City Football Stadium in Osaka on January 1, 2017. Kashima Antlers won the championship.

Match details

See also
2016 Emperor's Cup

References

Emperor's Cup
2016 in Japanese football
Kashima Antlers matches
Kawasaki Frontale matches